Miyu Takahira (born 4 November 1999) is a Japanese professional footballer who plays as a defender for WE League club MyNavi Sendai.

Club career 
Takahira made her WE League debut on 12 September 2021.

References

External links

WE League players
Japanese women's footballers
1999 births
Mynavi Vegalta Sendai Ladies players
Living people
Women's association football defenders
Association football people from Shizuoka Prefecture